Safi al-Din is an Arabic masculine given name and surname. It may also be spelled as Safi-ad-din, Safiuddin, Safieddine etc. The name is composed of two Arabic elements: Safi (صافي) meaning pure and Al-Din (الدین) religion. It may refer to:

Safi al-Din al-Urmawi (c. 1216 – 1294), Persian musician and writer
Safi al-Din al-Hindi (c. 1246–1315), Shafi'i-Ash'ari scholar
Safi-ad-din Ardabili (1252–1334), eponym of the Safavid dynasty
Safiuddin Ahmed (1922–2012), Bangladeshi painter
Francois Safieddine, American poker player

See also
 Safiuddin Sarker Academy and College, Bangladesh

Arabic masculine given names